Supersonic is the debut full-length studio album by American hip-hop group J. J. Fad. It was released on June 15, 1988, via Ruthless Records with executive production by Eazy-E. The album was certified gold by the Recording Industry Association of America on September 30, 1988. "Supersonic" was the band's biggest pop hit and was ranked #76 in VH1's 2009 special "100 Greatest One-Hit Wonders of the '80s".

Background
Audio production was handled by N.W.A members Dr. Dre and DJ Yella, alongside Arabian Prince, who served as co-producer. In addition to the title track ("Supersonic"), the singles were "Way Out" and "Is It Love". The album was distributed by Atco Records, a division of Atlantic Records. The title track was written by group members Dania Maria Birks and Juanita Michelle Burns-Sperling, former members Juanita A. Lee and Fatima Shasheed, and Kim Nazel.

Track listing

Personnel
Chris Bellman – mastering
Dania Maria Birks – lead vocals, backing vocals
Juana Michelle Burns – lead vocals, backing vocals
Antoine Carraby – producer, mixing, backing vocals
Bob Defrin – art direction
Michelle Franklin – lead vocals, backing vocals
Jerry Heller – management
Stanley A. Jones – guitar, backing vocals
Clarence Lars – scratches
Kim Renard Nazel – co–producer, mixing, backing vocals
Lorenzo Patterson – backing vocals
Aaron Rapoport – photography
Donovan Smith – mixing
Eric Wright – executive producer, backing vocals
Andre Young – producer, mixing, backing vocals

Charts

Weekly charts

Year-end charts

References

1988 debut albums
J. J. Fad albums
Ruthless Records albums
Albums produced by Dr. Dre
Albums produced by DJ Yella